Commercial Metals Company is a steel and metal manufacturer headquartered in Irving, Texas. The company operates four divisions: Americas Recycling, Americas Mills, Americas Fabrication, and International Mill, with locations in the U.S., Europe and Asia.

In the United States, it owns 41 scrap metal recycling facilities with a total annual capacity of 4.9 million tons, six electric arc furnace mini mills and two electric arc furnace micro mills and two re-rolling mills with a total annual capacity of 5.4 million tons, and steel fabrication facilities with a total annual capacity of 2.4 million tons. In Poland, it owns 12 scrap metal recycling facilities with a total annual capacity of 0.6 million tons, five steel fabrication facilities with a total annual capacity of 0.3 million tons, and a mini mill in Zawiercie with an annual capacity of 1.3 million tons. A sixth facility is planned to open in West Virginia in 2025.

History
In 1915, Russian immigrant Jacob Feldman founded American Iron & Metal Company, a scrap trading company.

In 1994, it acquired Owen Steel Company in an $87 million transaction.

In 2002, the company sold its heavy structural fabrication assets of SMI-Owen Steel, resulting in $20 million of proceeds. In June 2011, the company acquired G.A.M. Steel Pty. Ltd, based in Melbourne, Australia.

In November 2011, Carl Icahn offered to buy the company for $15 per share, which the company rejected the following month. By January 2012, Icahn withdrew the offer for lack of shareholder support.

In October 2016, it acquired the steel fabrication business of Associated Steel Workers, Limited.

In August 2017, the company sold its CMC Cometals Division for $179 million.

In November 2018, the company acquired assets from Gerdau for $600 million.

In 2022, Commercial Metals announced a new $450 million steel recycling plant to begin operating in Martinsburg, West Virginia in 2025. The facility will manufacture construction rebar that will operate using green technology.

See also 
 List of steel producers

References

External links

Companies listed on the New York Stock Exchange
Manufacturing companies established in 1915
Steel companies of the United States
Manufacturing companies based in Irving, Texas
1915 establishments in Texas